Jean Carlos Vicente (born 15 February 1992), or simply Jean Carlos, is a Brazilian professional footballer who plays as a central midfielder for Ceará.

Career
Jean Carlos was revealed in the youth categories of Palmeiras. In 2013, he moved to São Bernardo. In 2016, it was loaned to Vila Nova, to compete in the Campeonato Brasileiro Série B, which was the assists leader of the championship with 8 assists.

On 4 September 2016, he signed with the São Paulo FC on loan until the end of the 2017 Campeonato Paulista, with a purchase option at the end of it.

Honours
Goiás
Campeonato Goiano: 2017

Náutico
Campeonato Brasileiro Série C: 2019
Campeonato Pernambucano: 2021

References

External links

 zerozero.pt
 WebSoccerClub

1992 births
Living people
People from Cornélio Procópio
Brazilian footballers
Association football midfielders
Campeonato Brasileiro Série A players
Campeonato Brasileiro Série B players
Campeonato Brasileiro Série C players
Marília Atlético Clube players
Sociedade Esportiva Palmeiras players
São Bernardo Futebol Clube players
Vila Nova Futebol Clube players
São Paulo FC players
Goiás Esporte Clube players
Grêmio Novorizontino players
Coritiba Foot Ball Club players
Mirassol Futebol Clube players
Clube Náutico Capibaribe players
Sportspeople from Paraná (state)
Ceará Sporting Club players